Badminton at the 2019 South Asian Games was held in Badminton Covered Hall in Pokhara, Nepal between 1 and 6 December 2019. The badminton programme in 2019 included men's and women's singles competitions; men's, women's and mixed doubles competitions along with men's and women's team events. A total of 94 players from seven countries competed in the competition for 7 gold, 7 silver, and 14 bronze medals.

Medal summary

Medal table

Medalists

Results

Men's singles

Women's singles

Men's doubles

Women's doubles

Mixed doubles

References

External links 
 Badminton at www.13sagnepal.com

2019 South Asian Games
Events at the 2019 South Asian Games
2019
South Asian Games
2019 in Nepalese sport
Badminton tournaments in Nepal